Atelopus dimorphus is a species of toads in the family Bufonidae endemic to Peru. Its natural habitats are subtropical or tropical moist montane forests and rivers.

References

dimorphus
Amphibians of Peru
Amphibians described in 2003
Taxonomy articles created by Polbot